Andrei Netto (Ijuí, 1977) is a Brazilian journalist and author. He worked at Gazeta Mercantil and Zero Hora. He is currently a correspondent to O Estado de S. Paulo in Paris, France. He graduated in Communication at Pontifícia Universidade Católica do Rio Grande do Sul, where he also got his master's degree, and he obtained his doctorate at Université René Descartes, in Paris.

He covered the 2011 Libyan Civil War and was arrested, gaining national attention due to the episode. He registered his accounts in a book called O silêncio contra Muamar Kadafi - A revolução da Líbia pelo repórter brasileiro que esteve nos calabouços do regime, which was later released in English as Bringing Down Gaddafi: On the Ground with the Libyan Rebels.

Bibliography

References

External links
 Andrei Netto's blog at O Estado de S. Paulo's site

1977 births
Living people
Brazilian journalists
People from Ijuí
Brazilian expatriates in France